Marina Elvira Calderone (born 30 July 1965) is an Italian politician. In October 2022, she was appointed Minister of Labour and Social Policies in the Meloni Cabinet.

Biography 
Graduated in International Business Economics at the University of Cagliari, she decided to continue her studies following an industrial relations course in the same university. With Rosario De Luca, her husband, she has a firm that carries out job consultancy with offices in Cagliari, Reggio Calabria and Rome.

In 1994,  she joined the competent territorial order of Labor Consultants and in 2005 became President of the National Council of the Order of Labour Consultants. In 2014, she was appointed by Renzi Cabinet as a member of the board of directors of Leonardo-Finmeccanica, a position she held until 2020. Subsequently in the Conte I Cabinet, she was nominated for the presidency of the National Institute for Social Security.

References 

Living people
1965 births
21st-century Italian women politicians
Women government ministers of Italy
University of Cagliari alumni
Italian Ministers of Labour